The 2022–23 Pepperdine Waves men's basketball team represented Pepperdine University during the 2022–23 NCAA Division I men's basketball season. The Waves were led by head coach Lorenzo Romar, in the fifth season of his second stint after coaching the Waves from 1996 to 1999. They played their home games at the Firestone Fieldhouse in Malibu, California as members of the West Coast Conference.

Previous season
The Waves finished the 2021–22 season 7–25, 1–15 in WCC play to finish in last place. They lost in the first round to San Diego of the WCC tournament.

Offseason

Departures

Incoming transfers

Recruiting classes

2022 recruiting class

2023 recruiting class

Roster

Schedule and results

|-
!colspan=9 style=| Non conference regular season

|-
!colspan=9 style=| WCC regular season

|-
!colspan=9 style=| WCC tournament

Source

References

Pepperdine Waves men's basketball seasons
Pepperdine
Pepperdine
Pepperdine